Beatriz Pereira de Alvim (1380–1414) was a Portuguese noblewoman, the only child of  Nuno Álvares Pereira and his wife Leonor de Alvim.

On 8 November 1401, she married Afonso, Count of Barcelos, illegitimate son of king John I of Portugal. She died before her husband became Duke of Braganza.

Afonso and Beatriz had three children.
 Afonso of Braganza (1400–1460), 4th Count of Ourém and 1st Marquis of Valença, had a natural son from Dona Brites de Sousa (some say they secretly married). His issue took the name de Portugal
 Isabella of Braganza (1402–1465), married her uncle Infante John, Lord of Reguengos, son of John I of Portugal
 Ferdinand I, Duke of Braganza (1403–1478), succeeded his father as second Duke of Braganza

References

Bibliography  
 
 

1380 births
1414 deaths
Beatriz
14th-century Portuguese people
15th-century Portuguese people
14th-century Portuguese women
15th-century Portuguese women